The Getrag 247 transmission is an AMT (automated manual transmission). The gears are changed with a hydraulic actuator system, controlled by an electronic control unit.

247 AMT